Polymarchs is the name of a mobile DJ collective (or SONIDERO) based in Mexico City which plays Electronic dance music. Polymarchs was created in the late 1970s as a mobile DJ collective by Oaxacan native, Apolinar Silva de la Barrera and his sister Maria during the Disco music phenomenon of the 1970s. It began playing shows in distinct Mexico City neighborhoods and began headlining successful sold out shows by the early 1980s. By the late 1980s as the overall popularity of Disco music diminished in Mexico, Polymarchs was one of the selected few that successfully changed its musical format to appeal to younger audiences. As of 2012, Polymarchs continues to be active in the Mexico City area with its resident DJ actively performing in events throughout the area.

Origins (1973 - 1978)
Apolinar Silva De La Barrera came up with the idea of Polymarchs after he entered the IPN to study electromechanics. He envisioned a collective (or a SONIDERO as they are actively called in Mexico City) which provided a sound-system, a light-show and a DJ playing records to a crowd. Apolinar presented this idea to his sister Mary, who agreed to help him and with the help of their other siblings, Elisa and Luis, they formed the collective sometime in the early 1970s and fused each of their names as such:

Apolinar (POLY), Maria (MAR), Elisa (who was nicknamed "Lichi")(CH) and added the S of their last name Silva.

There is much uncertainty as to when exactly Polymarchs was exactly formed, however in several interviews Apolinar has stated that Polymarchs began to tour the streets of Mexico City in the mid to late 1970s. The original year of inception is considered to be 1978, since Polymarchs celebrated their 30th anniversary in 2008 at the World Trade Center Mexico. The original lineup consisted of Apolinar and his friend Jaime Ruelas as the main DJ's and his sister Mary as the emcee for the events. The famous Polymarchs logo, that is still used to this day, was created by Ruelas while he was studying graphic design at the time. eventually Ruelas quit Polymarchs and focused on becoming a full graphic design artist. He designs many of Polymarchs's album covers and was hired at Discos Musart in the 1990s.

The original fliers for the events consisted of a viking mascot well into the 1980s, yet at the suggestion of veteran radio DJ, Mario Vargas, Polymarchs began incorporating Egyptian figures after the jock labeled the collective as "El Faraonico Polymarchs".

While Polymarchs was not the first collective or SONIDO formed in Mexico City, they were indeed one of the few collectives that didn't play Cumbia or Salsa music which was popular in the streets at the time. Disco music was in its full glory in the late 1970s and Polymarchs incorporated this sound through the end of the decade.

The Beginnings (1980 - 1984)
Marco Antonio Silva De La Barrera, who was Apolinar's nephew, wanted to join the family business. An avid dancer in high school, Marco Antonio (who was nicknamed "Tony") was fascinated with the Disco music scene and wanted to join Polymarchs. With the departure of Ruelas, Tony ultimately dropped out of high school and joined in as the new DJ of the collective. Apolinar also incorporated a "ballet" or dance team into the collective with live dancers on stage and put Tony in charge of choreography.

By this time, Polymarchs had already branched out to numerous suburbs of the city performing in parks and halls, packing many of them well over capacity. Mary recalls in an interview that when she was working the gate one night, a large group of people rushed the gates and toppled the booth with her inside. Around this time, it is believed that Mary ultimately left the collective to form her own called "Rhamses". The reason for Mary's departure is not known, but the two collectives, Rhamses and Polymarchs were often seen headlining shows together well into the late 1980s.

In the early 1980s, Disco music gave way to Hi-NRG and Italo disco which proved to be popular in Mexico City and Polymarchs sought to innovate the dance music scene in Mexico City by booking out large concert halls and sports arenas to host its massive productions. Larger venues also allowed the SONIDO to get in touch with popular disco stars such as Gloria Gaynor and Sylvester James to come to Mexico City and perform live in front of thousands of people, opportunities which disco stars couldn't achieve in other countries at the time. In anticipation for these events, street teams blanketed the city with promotional fliers and posters, many of which are deemed as collectors items to this day.

Mexico City radio stations also began to take note in the SONIDO's success and invited Tony Barrera as a guest DJ numerous times in many of the station's weekend prime-time slots. Music enthusiasts recorded the radio shows on cassette tapes and were impressed by Tony Barrera's DJ mixing abilities. Many of these tapes are considered rarities.

Discos Musart

Since the early 1980s, Tony Barrera would record his performances and distributed cassette tapes with the "POLYMARCHS" imprint at each of their shows. The collective got in touch with major label Discos Musart and the first Polymarchs production came out on 12" in 1984. Thanks to Discos Musart, Polymarchs was able to distribute their mixtapes throughout the country and the label took care of paying royalties to the artists. Polymarchs continued to distribute mixes at their shows, but these were released on the "Scorpion" label through the year 1988. After 1988, these tapes were distributed under the label "Ace".

Polymarchs released their official productions through Discos Musart on vinyl and cassette tape. After 1992, the label began releasing each production on CD. Starting in 1992, the Polymarchs productions contain multiple mixes instead of just one mix per year.

Polymarchs is assumed to still be in contract with Discos Musart, however, the official website has stated that Polymarchs is now a part of Sony Music. However, this has not been confirmed as of 2012.

Heyday (1985–1998)

Polymarchs continued their success with numerous shows and concerts all throughout Mexico City. By the mid-1980s however, many other SONIDOS emerged with similar formats like Polymarchs. Around this time, many SONIDOS joined forces and collaborated on a show together. This was called "guerra de sonidos" which literally means "war of the sounds". Other famous SONIDOS with similar formats like Polymarchs include "WINNERS", "SOUNDSET", "PATRICK MILLER" and "VALENTINO". Polymarchs was the innovator of the "guerra de sonidos" movement and gave proper recognition to some of the SONIDOS based on popular vote. The first instance was in 1986, when Polymarchs packed Palacio de los Deportes sport arena in Mexico City with over 32,000 fans. Sylvester James was brought out to perform and awards and recognitions were given out. This was Polymarchs's record in attendance until 2005, when it was surpassed by a show at Mexico's Zocalo with over 90,000 fans. The second instance was in 1989, where Polymarchs booked Canadian Disco group Tapps and Italo disco band "Kinky Go".

As the 1980s drew to a close, Hi-NRG, Italo disco and Eurobeat styles lost popularity in Mexico and were replaced by Eurodance styles that incorporated House and Techno. Polymarchs began to fuse these newer genres into their productions so abruptly that by 1990, it had dropped all of its Hi-NRG, Italo disco and Eurobeat material from its promotional mixes. Instead, these promotional tapes began to include Hip House, New Beat and Rock music. This change, divided the collective's fan base. Some welcomed this change, but to many who wanted the Hi-NRG, Italo disco and Eurobeat music to continue, decided to lean towards the SONIDOS that continued to play it, such as PATRICK MILLER and SOUNDSET. It is believed that both Polymarchs and Patrick Miller are in a bit of a rivalry, yet both Tony and Mary explained that Patrick Miller declined invitations by both Polymarchs and Rhamses to perform together.

In spite of the change, the younger generation welcomed the new Polymarchs. The SONIDO rebuilt its entire light-show and sound-system by the early 1990s. The SONIDO branched out to other states in Mexico and continued to sell out venues in Mexico City. When the newly formed TV Azteca and Alfa Radio 91.3 began to host yearly music festivals in the Palacio de los Deportes, Polymarchs was responsible for the light-show and the sound-system. Tony Barrera was also welcomed on board as the choreographer for the background dancers. Tony Barrera also provided choreography and wardrobes for dancers at the Acapulco Festival.

Death of Tony (1998)
By the late 1990s, Tony Barrera received numerous opportunities to headline in nightclubs and festivals, as well as coveted radio and television slots, but Tony publicly stated that he was passionate about his family's business and how he would continue working for Polymarchs for years to come. Tony was also considered a philanthropist for his humanitarian efforts in his hometown of Puerto Angel, Oaxaca after Hurricane Pauline devastated the area in 1997. To make his mark in his hometown, Tony also opened a small nightclub which overlooked the beach; a place believed Tony would frequent on his trips back home.

On the night of 24 May 1998, A neighbor saw Tony giving a golden necklace as well as several miscellaneous items to a man who was believed to be a colleague outside his Culhuacan apartment. The man, who later returned with two other males, continued to converse with Tony before they all proceeded to enter his apartment. Local law enforcement officials believe that Tony personally knew these individuals by the manner in which they all spoke to each other. The same three individuals were seen boarding Tony's 1989 Thunderbird a few hours later. The car was retrieved several days later in a different section of the city by law enforcement.

On the morning of 26 May 1998, Tony's body was found in his apartment after friends and colleagues tried contacting him for days. He was discovered nude crouched on his bed with his head touching the floor. The autopsy results conclude that he suffered extensive head trauma by a choke-hold that punctured his trachea, destroyed his cervical vertebrae and several vital organs. There was also evidence of rectal perforation while examining his corpse. Law enforcement ruled his death a homicide.

Based on the evidence found by law enforcement, it was believed that motive for his death was homophobia, after several neighbors, friends and family confirmed that Tony began to "act strange" towards the latter part of his life. The newspaper La Prensa reported the possible motive as "revenge over homosexuals". While many fans and witnesses believed Tony was indeed a homosexual man, Tony, nor his family or friends have admitted that he was indeed a gay man. As of 2012, the motives for his murder are still unclear and no further evidence pointed to any possible suspects.

Tony's death was recognized by the local nightlife community all throughout Mexico City. Several colleagues from other SONIDOS, record labels, radio and television stations all gave their condolences to the Barrera family. His funeral, in his native Puerto Angel, Oaxaca, was a 5 kilometer procession through the city streets where the local schoolchildren, ordinary citizens and even the local naval sector were present. Many recognized Tony's previous humanitarian efforts to rebuild much of the city. Mexico City radio station Alfa Radio 91.3 presented Tony's last mix-show as a tribute to him. Other SONIDOS also got together and formed a "guerra de sonidos" in tribute to Tony. Discos Musart made a compilation of all of the songs he recorded in the 1990s and released them as a CD entitled "Tony Barrera - 1963-1998". Polymarchs gave Tony the eternal title of chief choreographer. Many of Tony's dance routines are still used by the collective up to this day. Tony's death was also mourned by the Mexican DJ community with some DJ's crediting him as "Mexico's #1 DJ". Polymarchs continues to host tributes to Tony in their performances, the largest ones being in 2002 at the Zocalo, in 2003 for the 5th anniversary of his death, and in 2008 for the 10th anniversary of his death.

Recent Years (1998 - Present) 

After Tony's death, Apolinar hired Victor Estrella, another SONIDERO DJ that DJ'ed for the SONIDO "Winners" since the late 1980s. This decision proved to be highly controversial since Victor and Tony had different DJing styles. Polymarchs continued to play Eurodance music until about 2001, where Polymarchs decided to introduce more Eurodance and Electro music styles. After Alfa Radio 91.3 switched formats to a more current rock format, Polymarchs began providing sound and lighting to the music festivals hosted by rival station "Stereo 97.7", which lasted until about 2004.

Polymarchs also re-introduced the Hi-NRG and Italo disco formats in many of their shows. Often, Polymarchs divided a show with older formats and newer styles which proved to be a hit with both the older and newer generations. Polymarchs also modernized their sound and lighting for the new millennium. This move ultimately led them to their first ever sold-out show at the Zocalo in the heart of the city in 2002. This became the first production in which was recorded as live audio by Discos Musart like the cassette tapes were from the 1980s. Polymarchs also performed numerous times at the Torero De Cuatro Caminos with many sold-out shows. In 2003, Polymarchs hosted a tribute to its longtime DJ, Tony Barrera by bringing Tapps to perform live. In 2005, the collective once again performed at the Zocalo with a record 90,000 people in attendance. This has been the collective's most successful show to date.

In recent years, Polymarchs has experimented with more mainstream styles, and continues to play its House and Electro formats as well as Italo disco sparingly. Victor Estrella continues to DJ for Polymarchs and the collective continues to tour all across Mexico and select shows across the United States. Recently, Polymarchs hasn't toured as extensively as they did in earlier years, but Apolinar hopes to continue the collective for a few more years. He has publicly admitted that the SONIDERO era has ended and that Polymarchs's success is numbered. Apolinar believes that the collective will continue for a few more years before he retires the family business altogether in the near future.

According to their official website, the collective stopped recording productions for Discos Musart since 2010. Several unofficial productions of the years 2011 to 2013 have spawned on various forums and blogs on the internet, yet their publicist insists that there are no such productions in the works with Musart or any other record company for that matter. As of 2012, their website includes a link where a bunch of audio and lighting equipment is up for sale. Several items include several LED panels and line array systems.

Legacy

Polymarchs is considered to date one of the most successful SONIDOS in Mexico City history. It continues to have a strong fanbase worldwide from both musicgoers, and aspiring DJ's and producers. Since the collective's inception in the late 1970s, Polymarchs was responsible of exploiting the Mexico City underground dance scene for more than 30 years. Due to the collective's versatility, Polymarchs was the only SONIDO that has achieved a high level of success after only a few years time. The legacy of the SONIDO lives on in those who once attended a show or a sold-out concert throughout the years. Many mixes that have been recorded on cassette tapes years back are now showcased and traded between fans on numerous forums. Album covers and posters are still collected and traded and maintain a decent amount of value. Polymarchs is considered to be a true contender in the SONIDERO movement and has influenced other SONIDOS, DJ's and musicians to form and perform.

Mexican musical groups
Mexican DJs
Mexican musicians